Greater Grace International School, formerly known as the Greater Grace Christian Academy is a Christian school in Budapest, Hungary. The school offers a US curriculum and is accredited by the Association of Christian Schools International.

References

Schools in Hungary